"Yaya" (stylized in all caps) is a song by American rapper 6ix9ine. It was released on July 3, 2020, alongside a music video, as the third single from his second studio album, TattleTales, released on September 4, 2020. The song was written by 6ix9ine, Anuel AA, Anas Rahmoune, Edgar Semper, John Iyinbor, Kedin Maysonet, Luian Malave, Pablo Fuentes, and Xavier Semper and produced by Ramoon and Ransom Beatz. It interpolates the 2003 song "Baila Morena" by Puerto Rican reggaeton duo Héctor & Tito.

Background
6ix9ine first announced the song and its release date on June 27, 2020, in an Instagram Story. He confirmed the track's title in an Instagram video on June 29, with a bikini-clad woman (who would later appear in the music video) giving him a lap dance and twerking in a studio. He previewed the song with him singing in Spanish and further called it his "best one so far". This marks the third time 6ix9ine, whose mother is Mexican and father is Puerto Rican, released a Spanish song, following the Dummy Boy tracks "Bebe" and "Mala", both of which featured Puerto Rican rapper Anuel AA.

On September 4, 2020, 6ix9ine announced in a Billboard interview that Anuel AA was supposed to be in "Yaya" and they wrote the song together.

Music video 
As with "Gooba" and "Trollz", the video for "Yaya" was filmed at 6ix9ine's home, in his living room, while he was under house arrest. The video was released along with the song.

Commercial performance
"Yaya" debuted at number 99 on the Billboard Hot 100, tying with "Gotti" as 6ix9ine's lowest charting single to date. It is a commercial failure in comparison to his previous single "Trollz", which peaked at number one, three weeks prior. The song peaked at number four on the Billboard Hot Latin Songs chart.

In Europe, the song was moderately successful, peaking at number eight in Hungary, number 46 in Switzerland and number 87 in the UK, becoming one of the least successful songs of his career.

Personnel
Credits adapted from Tidal and YouTube.

 6ix9ine – lead artist, songwriting
 Anas Rahmoune – songwriting, arrangement, production
 Edgar Semper – songwriting
 John Iyinbor – songwriting, arrangement, production
 Anuel AA – songwriting
 Kedin Maysonet – songwriting
 Luian Malave – songwriting
 Pablo Fuentes – songwriting
 Xavier Semper – songwriting
 Wizard Lee – mixing, mastering
 Alex Solis – art direction, design

Charts

Release history

References

2020 songs
2020 singles
6ix9ine songs
Songs written by 6ix9ine
Spanish-language songs
Songs written by Anuel AA
Songs written by Edgar Semper
Songs written by Xavier Semper
Reggaeton songs